Protein YIF1A is a Yip1 domain family proteins that in humans is encoded by the YIF1A gene.

Gene 

YIF1A (Yip1 interacting factor homolog A) is also known as YIF1, YIF1P, FinGER7, and 54TM. It has 4,591 base pairs with 8 exons, and it is located on the minus strand of chromosome 11, at 11q13.2, in humans.

Promoters 
There are four predicted promoter for YIIF1A. The predicted promoter region with highest confidence is GXP_50494 and has 1252 base pairs long; it extends past the first exon of YIF1A. This promoter is located on the minus strand of chromosome 11.

Transcription factors 
The promoter of YIF1A transcript variant 1 contains numerous transcription factor binding sites. Transcription factors predicted to bind to the promoter region include the following.

 Acute myeloid leukemia 1 protein, RUNX1 (runt-related transcription factor 1) 
 Zinc finger protein 263, ZKSCAN12 (zinc finger protein with KRAB and SCAN domains 12)
 E2F transcription factor 1 
 EGR1, early growth response 1
 GATA-binding factor 1 
 Transcription factor CP2-like 1 (LBP-9)
 X-box binding protein RFX1
 Estrogen response elements (ER alpha), IR3 sites
 Lactotransferrin and deltalactoferrin, growth-inhibiting protein 12
 TGFB-inducible early growth response protein 1 (KLF10)

Expression 
The expression of YIF1A is highest in the duodenum and liver. It is also expressed at moderate levels in tissues including the colon, ovary, pancreases, spleen, and esophagus, and expressed at lower levels in a variety of other tissues. NCBI GeoProfile data provide the tissue expression graph for YIF1A in humans; it also indicates that YIF1A is expressed at moderately to moderately low across all other tissues.

mRNA 
YIF1A has isoforms 1 and 2, with exons 8 and 7 respectively. The two transcripts undergo alternate splicing and are translated into proteins with 293 and 241 amino acids, respectively.

RNA-binding proteins 
The 5' untranslated region has predicted sites for binding by RBXM, EIF4B, and FUS. The 3' untranslated region has predicted sites for binding by ELAVL1, which is AU rich elements and regulate mRNA stability.

Protein 

The longest protein isoform of YIF1A is 293 amino acids in length. It has an observed molecular weight of approximately 32.0 kDa with a predicted isoelectric point of approximately 8.98.

Composition 
YIF1 is a very normal protein in terms of the amino acid quantities it contains. The composition of each amino acid residue is similar to its average relative composition among human proteins. There are no charge clusters, runs, or patterns. There is a repetitive structure for protein YIF1A at [ 201- 204 and 288- 291 ] TFHL.

Domain and motifs 
YIF1A has a conserved domain, pfam03878 (AA 57 →287). Within the domain, there are 5 transmembrane domains, 3 non-cytosolic domains, and 3 cytosolic domains. It has been hypothesized that there is a possible role in transport between the endoplasmic reticulum and Golgi.

Structure 

The structure of YIF1A consist of approximately 59% alpha-helices, with TM helix and disordered regions making up the rest of the structure; no beta- strand was predicted.

Localization 
YIF1A's predicted location is in the endoplasmic reticulum, with intracellular N-terminus and an extracellular C-terminus.

Post-translational modifications 
YIF1A undergoes methionine cleavage and N-terminal acetylation, which is one of the most common post translation modifications of eukaryotic proteins. It also phosphorylated by unspecified kinases at several sites. Three glycation site is predicted in lysine residue(lys 104,161, and 211). YIF1A undergoes O-ß-GlcNAc modification at 5 sites, 1 of them being Yin-Yang sites.

Interacting protein 
Based on fluorescence microscopy, validated two hybrid, and anti tag coimmunoprecipitation, the protein that is most likely to interact with YIF1A are GPR37, SEC23IP, REEP2, and YIPF5. Studies suggest that interaction between VAPB and YIF1A control membrane delivery into dendrites. It also participates in ER unfolded protein response (UPR) by inducing ERN1/IRE1. Additionally, the YIF1A protein interacts with the M protein of SARS-Cov-2.

Homology 
YIF1A has a single Paralog called YIF1B, which is located on human chromosome 19. YIF1A has 238 identified orthologs. The ortholog contains vertebrates such as mammals, amphibians, and reptiles. It also has invertebrates species such as Insecta, Anthozoa, and Ascidiacea. No ortholog was found in protists, bacteria, or archaea.

The following table provides a sample of the ortholog of YIF1A.

References

Further reading